The Metropolitan Area of the Aburrá Valley  (Spanish: Área Metropolitana del Valle de Aburrá) is the second most important and populated metropolitan area in Colombia. The region is made up of ten municipalities, Medellín (Colombia) being the most important and largest the capital city of the Antioquia Department.

History
The Metropolitan Area of the Aburrá Valley was the first metropolitan area created in Colombia, in 1980. The metropolitan area was created in order to produce economic integration, projection, and planning for urban development in the cities over the Aburra Valley.

The total population of the ten cities and municipalities part of this metropolitan area is close to four million inhabitants. The development of the Aburra Valley occurred in the 1930s after a rapid population growth that produced a conurbation of Medellín, Itagüí, Envigado, and Bello.

Medellín, as the capital of the Antioquia Department, main economic center and host of most of local government entities contributed to a rapid urban development which absorbed many corregimientos such as Robledo, La América, La Floresta, Guayabal, and Belén, among others. With the industrialization the middle and higher class moved to the southern parts of the city such as El Poblado, which ultimately reached the city of Envigado, while the working class population of Medellín reached cities to the north (Bello) and the southwest (Itagüí).

Geography

The Metropolitan Area of the Aburrá Valley borders with the municipalities of Ebejico, Heliconia, Angelopolis, and Amagá to the west, with the municipalities of Santa Barbara and Fredonia to the south. To the southwest it borders with the Eastern Antioquia region and to the north with the municipalities of San Jeronimo, San Pedro, and Don Matías covering a total area of 1,152 km2. The largest being the territory of the municipality of Medellín with 382 km2 and the smallest one Sabaneta with 15 km2.

Most of the Metropolitan Area is located within the Aburrá Valley.

Municipalities

See also
Metropolitan Areas of Colombia

References

External links
 Government of Colombia - Se Educa: Aburra Valley
 Valley of Aburra Google Map

 
Regions of Antioquia Department
Metropolitan areas of Colombia